Saint-Judas-de-la-nuit  is a Belgian fantasy novel by Jean Ray. It was first published in 1955.

Links 
 

1964 novels
Belgian speculative fiction novels
French-language novels